Germán Coppini López-Tormos (19 November 1961 – 24 December 2013) was a Spanish singer-songwriter, best known as a member of the bands Siniestro Total and Golpes Bajos.

Coppini died from liver cancer on 24 December 2013, aged 52, in Madrid.

References

1961 births
2013 deaths
People from Santander, Spain
Singers from Cantabria
Spanish pop musicians
Spanish singer-songwriters
Deaths from liver cancer
Deaths from cancer in Spain
20th-century Spanish musicians
20th-century Spanish male singers
20th-century Spanish singers